The 1988 Asian Basketball Confederation Championship for Women were held in Hong Kong

Results

Final standing

Awards

References 
Results
FIBA Archive

1988
1988 in women's basketball
women
International women's basketball competitions hosted by Hong Kong
B